The "Vocabolario siciliano" is a five-volume lexicographic work on the Sicilian language by Giorgio Piccitto, Salvatore Tropea, and Salvatore Carmelo Trovato. It was realised with assistance from the Sicilian Autonomous Region and the National Research Council (Italy). 

The initial project for the creation of a Sicilian-Italian dictionary was by Professor Giorgio Piccitto, in 1950. The project was then realized thanks to the linguistic section Opera del Vocabolario Siciliano created specifically by the Center for Philological and Linguistic Studies of Sicily. 

It was published between 1977 and 2002 and is considered the highest reference on the subject, with a total of about 5,500 pages. It was also realized with the contribution of the Sicilian Region and the National Research Council. It is one of the most important works ever carried out on the Sicilian language.

References

Sicilian dictionaries